Reuben Jonathan Miller (born 23 September 1976) is an American writer, sociologist, criminologist and social worker from Chicago, Illinois. He teaches at the University of Chicago in the Crown Family School of Social Work, Policy, and Practice and in the Department of Race, Diaspora, and Indigeneity. He is also a research professor at the American Bar Foundation.

Miller studies social life at the intersections of race, justice and social welfare policy, attending to what our systems of punishment and care tell us about ourselves and the moral and ethical state of a given nation. His research has been published in journals of law, criminology, human rights, sociology, public health, social work and psychology. In 2022, he was awarded a "genius grant" through the MacArthur Fellows Program for his work tracing the long-term consequences of incarceration and prisoner re-entry on families in the United States and the ways that mass incarceration has changed the social life of the American city.

He is the author of the 2021 book Halfway Home: Race, Punishment, and the Afterlife of Mass Incarceration. Halfway Home makes the case that once incarcerated, one is never truly free. Rather, "prison follows you like a ghost," shaping everyday interactions and altering the contours of American democracy one (most often poor and Black) family at a time. Following incarcerated and formerly incarcerated people and people directly (and indirectly) impacted by the incarceration of their loved ones, Miller draws from his experience as the brother and son of formerly incarcerated men to make sense of how mass incarceration shapes American citizenship and the work people with records do each day to find and make dynamic lives for themselves and their families. Halfway Home was a finalist for the PEN/John Kenneth Galbraith Award for Nonfiction and the Los Angeles Times Book Prize for Current Affairs. It won the 2022 Herbert Jacob Book Prize and two PROSE Awards, one for Excellence in Social Science and the other in Cultural Anthropology and Sociology from the Association of American Publishers.

Early life and education
Miller was born in Chicago, IL. He earned a B.A. from Chicago State University, an A.M. from the University of Chicago and a PhD from Loyola University Chicago.

Career
Miller began his career as a volunteer chaplain at the Cook County Jail. Upon completing a doctorate in Sociology in 2013, he worked as an Assistant Professor of Social Work at the University of Michigan. In 2016, he was awarded membership at the Institute for Advanced Study in Princeton, New Jersey. In 2017 he joined the faculty at the University of Chicago and was promoted to Associate Professor with tenure in 2021. Earlier that year, he published his first sole authored book, Halfway Home: Race, punishment and the afterlife of mass incarceration. In 2022, Miller was awarded a MacArthur Fellowship for his research on the ways that incarceration has shaped the social world and its long-term impacts on the poor and especially on poor black people in the United States.

Bibliography
 Miller, Reuben Jonathan. Halfway Home: Race, Punishment, and the Afterlife of Mass Incarceration. Little Brown and Co. 2021.  
 Miller, Reuben Jonathan. "All Leviathan’s Children: Race, Punishment and the (Re-) Making of the City." In Class, Ethnicity and State in the Polarized Metropolis, pp. 215–229. Palgrave Macmillan, Cham, 2019.  
 Miller, Reuben Jonathan, and Forrest Stuart. "Carceral citizenship: Race, rights and responsibility in the age of mass supervision." Theoretical Criminology 21, no. 4 (2017): 532–548.      
 Miller, Reuben Jonathan & Amanda Alexander. "The price of (carceral) citizenship: Punishment, surveillance and social welfare policy in an age of carceral expansion". Michigan Journal of Race and Law 21 (2): 291-311 2016).    
 Miller, Reuben Jonathan, Janice Williams Miller, Jelena Zeleskov Djoric, & Desmond Upton Patton. "Baldwin’s Mill: Race, Carceral Expansion and the Pedagogy of Repression, 1965-2015". Humanity and Society, 39(4): 456-475 (2015).  
 Miller, Reuben Jonathan. "Devolving the carceral state: Race, prisoner reentry, and the micropolitics of urban poverty management". Punishment & Society 16, no. 3 (2014): 305–335.

Awards and recognitions 
 2022  MacArthur Fellowship, John D. and Catherine T. MacArthur Foundation
 2022  Herbert Jacob Book Prize, Law and Society Association
 2022  PROSE Award, Excellence in Social Science, Association of American Publisher
 2022  PROSE Award, Cultural Anthropology and Sociology, Association of American Publishers
 2022  Finalist, PEN America/ John Kenneth Galbraith Literary Award for Nonfiction
 2022  Finalist, LA Times Book Prize, Current Affairs
 2022  Finalist, PROSE Award, Outstanding Trade Publication, Association of American Publishers
 2022  Rockefeller foundation Academic Writing Residency, Bellagio, Italy
 2022  Logan Nonfiction Writing Residency, Rensselaerville, NY
 2019  Eric and Wendy Schmidt National Fellow, New America Foundation, Washington D.C.
 2019  Visiting Demographer, Population Research Center, University of Texas at Austin.  
 2018  Visiting Fellow, Dartmouth Society of Fellows, Dartmouth University
 2014  Summer Research Institute Fellow, Racial Democracy, Crime and Justice Network, Ohio State University 
 2011  Dissertation Fellow, Department of Housing and Urban Development
 2011  Graduate Minority Fellow, American Society of Criminology   
 2009  Doctoral Fellowship, Chicago Center for Family Health
 2008  Rising Star Award, Policy Link
 2007  Robert R. McCormick Foundation Graduate Fellowship
 2006  Graduate Fellowship, Albert Schweitzer Foundation 
 2004  Volunteer Service Award, Cook County Department of Corrections

References 

American writers
Living people
1976 births